The Penthes Castle is a castle in the municipality of Pregny-Chambésy, in the Canton of Geneva, Switzerland. It is classified as Cultural Property of National and Regional Significance. 

The Penthes Castle is located within the Penthes estate. The estate is first documented as of 1358 as belonging to Guillaume de Visencier and housing a fortified house. During the 17th century, the estate becomes part of the fiefdom of Antoine de Charrière, lord of Penthaz. It is henceforth named after him. In 1761, the estate, then owned by the Geneva General Hospital (now known as the Geneva University Hospitals), is sold to Alexandre Sales de Genève, who transforms the fortified house into a manor.

In 1972, the Canton of Geneva purchases the Penthes estate. The Foundation for the History of the Swiss Abroad, dedicated to studying and promoting the history of the relations between Switzerland and the rest of the world, moves in the Castle in 1978 and creates a museum as well as a research center. The City of Geneva acquires the estate in 1983 and turns it into a public parc.

See also
List of castles and fortresses in Switzerland

References

External links
 
 A presentation of the Penthes Estate on the City of Geneva website. 
 The Penthes Castle on Swiss Castles. 

Castles in Switzerland
18th-century architecture in Switzerland